Rosie Swann (also Miller) is a fictional character from the BBC soap opera EastEnders, played by Gerry Cowper. Her first appearance was 6 September 2004 and she was axed in 2006, with her final scenes airing July 2006.

Rosie is the mother of Mickey Miller (Joe Swash), Dawn Swann (Kara Tointon), Demi Miller (Shana Swash) and Darren Miller (Charlie G. Hawkins). Described as "hardworking", she is heavily protective over her family and makes enemies such as Pauline Fowler (Wendy Richard) and Stacey Slater (Lacey Turner).

Storylines

Backstory
Rosie's mother committed suicide when she was young, leaving her with her brother, Clint, and other siblings. Rosie was married to Mike Swann (Mark Wingett), and they had two children, Mickey and Dawn (Joe Swash and Kara Tointon). While they were still very young, Mike left Rosie and wasn't seen for many years.

Rosie later met Keith Miller (David Spinx), who took on her children as his own before having twins, Darren and Demi (Charlie G. Hawkins and Shana Swash). He cannot read and is work-shy. He tends to sit around watching television all day, making excuses to Rosie as to why he does not go and find employment.

2004–2006
From her first appearance in 2004, Rosie is seen working hard to support her family. She has a number of cleaning jobs, and takes care of her granddaughter, Aleesha (Freya and Phoebe Coltman-West), while Demi and Darren go to school.

In December 2005, Rosie's ex-husband, Mike, is homeless and stays with the Millers'. Rosie and Mike have an affair, and she plans to leave Keith for Mike, taking Darren, Demi and Aleesha with them. Mickey and Dawn find out about this, and Mickey tries to convince her not to leave. Eventually, she decides she cannot take the twins away from their father, and chooses to stay with Keith. Rosie tells Keith about her affair, but does not mention she had planned to leave. Keith forgives her until Dawn lets slip that Rosie had planned to leave. Keith then leaves Rosie.

Keith soon moves back in when he proposes to Rosie, but he does not really want to get married and so he keeps putting off the wedding. Rosie, however, does not want to wait and the ceremony takes place on 4 July 2006 at Walford Register Office. Keith arrives late and with mud on his suit. Annoyed, Rosie jilts Keith during the ceremony and told him the next day that she no longer loves him and plans to take a job in the Cotswolds. She also wants to take Darren, Demi and Aleesha. They plan to leave the Square the next day but Darren does not want to go. Rosie convinces Keith to make sure Darren goes with them so Keith tells Darren he does not care about him. Upset, Darren prepares to leave with his mother, sister and niece. However Rosie can see how upset he is, and decides to tell him that Keith made it all up, allowing Darren to stay in Walford after all.

In July 2008, Rosie sends a letter to Keith about a job. Keith and Mickey then move to the Cotswolds to join her, Demi and Aleesha. It is later revealed that Rosie and Keith have reconciled.

Creation and development
In August 2004, it was announced that a new family was to be introduced to EastEnders.  Louise Berridge, the executive producer, commented: "I'm delighted to introduce the Miller family, who will be joining Mickey on Albert Square in September, but I warn you - this lot are trouble". She added: "Even the dog is dodgy. They're set to cause havoc all over the Square, and by the end of their first week the sparks will be flying - literally".

It was announced in February 2006 that Cowper and co-star Shana Swash had been axed from EastEnders by John Yorke. "Gerry and Shana have been enormous assets and go with our best wishes," said a spokesman, adding that there is a "massive" storyline had been planned for their exit.

References

External links
Rosie Miller at BBC Online

EastEnders characters
Television characters introduced in 2004
Female characters in television